The 1995 Tour of the Basque Country was the 35th edition of the Tour of the Basque Country cycle race and was held from 3 April to 7 April 1995. The race started in Zegama and finished at Jaizkibel. The race was won by Alex Zülle of the ONCE team.

General classification

References

1995
Bas